Tlapanaloya is a town in the municipality of Tequixquiac in Mexico State in Mexico. The town is bordered on the north La Heredad Ranch ranching The Homestead, south to the Tajo de Tequixquiac, east village Hueypoxtla and west by the town of Santiago Tequixquiac. The name Tlapanaloya is a Nahuatl toponymy, means Place where is broken stones, te- is stone,  is to brake,  is place.

Geography 

The town of Tlapanaloya, is an urban area in the municipality of Tequixquiac. The town is divided in four barrios (neighborhood.) and two colonias ejidales (Agricultural colony).

In Tlapanaloya cross a river Salado de Hueypoxtla, the water most important by irrigation; over hills there are many arroyos and jagueyes.

The orography is formed by hills and plains; the biggest hill is Monte Alto, the Tlapanaloya territory is dry plains of limestone.

History

Tetlapanaloyan was an eleven places of Hueypoxtla province that made a tax payment for the Aztec empire. This site was an Aztec altepetl (village) inhabited by otomi and nahua people.

Spanish period
In 1542, Tlapanaloya was given in encomienda to Spanish Juan Díaz de Lo Real, he built haciendas over Indian's agricultural lands and pay taxes to Hueypoxtla for Mexico City bishop.

Government and administrative divisions
Tlapanaloya is a town inside Tequixquiac municipality, the government known as Delegación, this town has got  regidores (councils) governing with municipal president.

Neighborhoods

Agricultural colonies

Culture

Historical monuments

 La Asunción parish is a most important monument in Tlapanaloya town, is located at main square. It is a Baroque church subject to Cuautitlan Diocese.
 Salado River bridge is a colonial construction by camino real way to Santiago Tequixquiac.
 La Esperanza hacienda is a Spanish building connecting with other haciendas and old towns.

References

Populated places in the State of Mexico
Populated places in the Teotlalpan
Tequixquiac
Otomi settlements
Nahua settlements